The 2023 NLL Stadium Showdown was a professional outdoor box lacrosse game that was held on March 4, 2023, at Snapdragon Stadium in San Diego, between the San Diego Seals and the Las Vegas Desert Dogs. It was played on an improvised box around the touchdown zone of the typical american football field. It was the first outdoor game in NLL history. The game coincided with an NCAA Division I Women's Lacrosse Championship tournament.

References 

National Lacrosse League
Lacrosse in California
NLL Stadium Showdown